Bhiwani district is one of the 22 districts of the northern Indian state of Haryana. Sirsa is now the largest district of the state.

Other major towns in the district are Siwani, Loharu, Tosham, Bawani Khera, Kohlawas, Lamba.

As of 2011 it is the third most populous district of Haryana (out of 21), after Faridabad and Hisar.

History
Pre-Indus Valley Civilization mine, smelt and houses have been found at Khanak hills of Tosham Hill range. Excavations (1968–73 and 1980–86) in the village of Mitathal in Bhiwani have unearthed evidence of pre-Harappan and Harappan (Indus Valley civilization) culture in the area. According to archaeologists the presence of coins, coin moulds, statues and design of the houses, suggests that a town existed here sometimes in the Kushan, Gupta and the Youdheya period till 300 BCE.

Bhiwani city is mentioned in the Ain-i-Akbari and has been a prominent centre of commerce since the time of the Mughals.

Divisions
The district comprises four sub-divisions: Bhiwani, Loharu, Siwani and Tosham. These sub-divisions are further divided into five Tehsils: Bhiwani, Loharu, Siwani, Bawani Khera and Tosham and one sub-tehsil, Behal.

There are five Vidhan Sabha constituencies in this district: Bhiwani, Loharu, Bawani Khera, Tosham and Bawani Khera. Bawani Khera is part of the Hisar (Lok Sabha constituency) while the rest are part of Bhiwani-Mahendragarh (Lok Sabha constituency).

Previously in Bhiwani district, sub-divisions Badhra and Charkhi Dadri and sub-tehsil Baund Kalan became part of the new Charkhi Dadri district in 2016.

Demographics

According to the 2011 census Bhiwani district has a population of 1,634,445, roughly equal to the nation of Guinea-Bissau or the US state of Idaho. This gives it a ranking of 306th in India (out of a total of 640). Its population growth rate over the decade 2001–2011 was 14.32%. Bhiwani has a sex ratio of 884 females for every 1000 males, and a literacy rate of 76.7%. After bifurcation the district has a population of 1,132,169. Scheduled Castes make up 251,736 (22.23%) of the population.

Religion 

{| class="wikitable sortable"
|+ Religion in Bhiwani District (1941)
|-
! Religion
! Population (1941)
! Percentage (1941)
|-
| Hinduism 
| 127,740
|
|-
| Islam  
| 29,554
|
|-
| Sikhism 
| 533
|
|-
| Christianity 
| 169
|
|-
| Others 
| 591
|
|-
| Total Population
| 158,587
| 
|}

Languages

At the time of the 2011 Census of India, 79.98% of the population in the district spoke Haryanvi and 18.12% Hindi as their first language.

Education

Degree colleges
 Adarsh Mahila Mahavidyalya
 Rajiv Gandhi College for Women
 Raja Neempal Singh Govt College
 Vaish P.G. College

Technological colleges
 BRCM College of Engineering
 Technological Institute of Textile & Sciences

University
 Chaudhary Bansi Lal University

Religious places

Kirorimal Mandir - Located in the heart of the city, temple of Vishnu.
Shri Khakhi Baba Mandir - Located on the bank of Tal. The whole Ramayana is inscribed on its walls.
Shri Jogi Wala Math - Devoted to Shiva and associated to Naath Pant.  
Shri Jahargir Mandir - Devoted to Shiva and associated to Giri Pant. 
Shri Bhoja Wali Devi Mandir - Devoted to Durga, also known as 84 Ghantiyon Wala Mandir'' (84 Bells Temple).  
Dhareru Dhaam - It is a village 12 km far from the district. Dedicated to Shyam Baba
Devsar Dhaam - It is located on a hillock on Bhiwani-Luharu road. It has a temple devoted to the goddess Vaishno Devi.
Manheru Dhaam - It is a village 11 km far from the district. There is a temple of Balaji Maharaj (Hanuman).

Sports

Sports played in the area include wrestling, volleyball, boxing and running. Hawa Singh won the Asian Games gold medal in Heavyweight category in consecutive editions of the games in the 1966 Asiad and the 1970 Asiad. Bhiwani has emerged as a centre of Indian boxing as all four boxers representing India at Beijing Olympics 2008 are products of Sports Authority of India (SAI) boxing hostel at Bhiwani. To top that three of them Akhil Kumar, Vijender Kumar and Jitender Kumar reached the quarterfinals of their respective categories. While Akhil Kumar and Jitender Kumar lost in their respective quarterfinals bouts Vijender Kumar qualified to the semifinals thereby ensuring India's first ever Boxing medal (Bronze) in the 2012 Summer Olympics. Paramjeet Samota who won a gold for India in the 2010 Commonwealth Games also lives in a large village called Dinod in the Bhiwani district.

Notable people

Bansi Lal - Former Chief Minister of Haryana
Dinesh Kumar - Boxer
Jitender Kumar (flyweight boxer)
Jitender Kumar (middleweight boxer)
Richhpal Ram - Victoria Cross winner in World War-II
Brijpal Singh, Vir Chakra
Hawa Singh - heavyweight boxer, Asian Games gold medal winner
Jagdish Singh - Boxer
 Air Marshal Prithi Singh
Vijay Kumar Singh PVSM, AVSM, YSM, ADC - COAS of Indian Army
Vijender Singh - Olympic Bronze medal winner in boxing
Air MarshalVikram Singh

Villages
See List of villages in Bhiwani district.

References

External links 

Official website of Bhiwani district
Best Hospital in Bhiwani

 
Districts of Haryana
1972 establishments in Haryana